Sin Mirar Atrás is the fifth studio album released by Los Mismos on November 21, 2000. This was the last album Los Mismos released for EMI Latin before leaving to Univision Music Group.

Eusebio "El Chivo" Cortez departed from the band and was replaced by Fred Ocon.

Track listing

References

2000 albums
Spanish-language albums
Los Mismos albums